"Walkin' Away" is a song by American country music artist Clint Black. It was written Black, Hayden Nicholas, Black's electric guitarist and Dick Gay, his drummer. It was released in February 1990 as the fourth single from his album, Killin' Time. The song was his fourth consecutive number-one hit on both the Billboard Hot Country Singles & Tracks chart and the Canadian RPM Country Tracks chart.

Music video
The music video, directed by Jim May and produced by Mary Matthews, features people on a merry go round with Clint singing in the shadows.

Chart performance
"Walkin' Away" spent two consecutive weeks at number 1 on the Billboard Hot Country Songs chart beginning May 19, 1990. It spent the next two weeks at number 1 on the Canadian RPM charts.

Year-end charts

References

1990 singles
Clint Black songs
Songs written by Clint Black
Songs written by Hayden Nicholas
Song recordings produced by James Stroud
Song recordings produced by Mark Wright (record producer)
RCA Records singles
1989 songs